The Best is a greatest hits album by American rock vocalist David Lee Roth, compiling his solo work from 1985 to 1996. It also features one song recorded for the album, "Don't Piss Me Off". The album was released in 1997 by Warner Bros. and Rhino Entertainment.

Track listing
 "Don't Piss Me Off"  – 4:28 (Brett Tuggle, Monty Byrom, Jack White, Steve Hunter, Freebo)
 "Yankee Rose"  – 3:53 (David Lee Roth, Steve Vai)
 "A Lil' Ain't Enough"  – 4:45 (Roth, Robbie Nevil)
 "Just Like Paradise"  – 4:07 (Roth, Tuggle)
 "Big Train"  – 4:19 (Roth, Terry Kilgore, Preston Sturges, Joey Hunting)
 "Big Trouble"  – 4:01 (Roth, Vai)
 "It's Showtime!"  – 3:50 (Roth, Jason Becker)
 "Hot Dog and a Shake"  – 3:23 (Roth, Vai)
 "Skyscraper"  – 3:43 (Roth, Vai)
 "Shy Boy"  – 3:26 (Billy Sheehan, arranged by Roth)
 "She's My Machine"  – 3:57 (Roth, Byron, David Neuhauser)
 "Stand Up"  – 4:44 (Roth, Tuggle)
 "Tobacco Road"  – 2:30 (John D. Loudermilk)
 "Easy Street"  – 3:51 (Dan Hartman)
 "California Girls"  – 2:54 (Brian Wilson, Mike Love)
 "Just a Gigolo/I Ain't Got Nobody"  – 4:44 (Leonello Casucci, Irving Caesar) (Spencer Williams, Roger Graham)
 "Sensible Shoes"  – 5:10 (Dennis Morgan, Sturges, Roth)
 "Goin' Crazy!"  – 3:11 (Roth, Vai)
 "Ladies' Nite in Buffalo?"  – 4:02 (Roth, Vai)
 "Land's Edge"  – 3:14 (Roth, Kilgore)

Track 1 is a new recording, 1997 
Tracks 14, 15 and 16 are from Crazy from the Heat, 1985 
Tracks 2, 6, 10, 13, 18 and 19 are from Eat 'Em and Smile, 1986 
Tracks 4, 8, 9, and 12 are from Skyscraper, 1988 
Tracks 3, 7, and 17 are from A Little Ain't Enough, 1991 
Tracks 5, 11 and 20 are from Your Filthy Little Mouth, 1994

Notes 

David Lee Roth albums
1997 greatest hits albums
Warner Records compilation albums
Rhino Entertainment compilation albums